FileZilla is a free and open-source, cross-platform FTP application, consisting of FileZilla Client and FileZilla Server. Clients are available for Windows, Linux, and macOS. Both server and client support FTP and FTPS (FTP over SSL/TLS), while the client can in addition connect to SFTP servers.

FileZilla's source code is hosted on SourceForge and the project was featured as Project of the Month in November 2003.

History
FileZilla was started as a computer science class project in the second week of January 2001 by Tim Kosse and two classmates.

Before they started to write the code, they discussed under which license they should release it. They decided to make FileZilla an open-source project because many FTP clients were already available, and they didn't think that they would sell a single copy if they made FileZilla commercial. Since its initial development in 2001, FileZilla has been released under the GNU General Public License (GPL). The FileZilla client is currently released under GPL-2.0-or-later, and the server package under AGPL-3.0-or-later.

Features

These are some features of FileZilla Client:
 Transfer files using FTP and encrypted FTP such as FTPS (server and client) and SFTP.
 Support IPv6 which is the latest version of internet protocol
 Supports resume which means the file transfer process can be paused and continued
 Ability to overwrite existing files only if the source file is newer
 Ability to overwrite existing files only if the file size does not match
Ability to preserve the time stamps of transferred files, given support by local system (downloading) or target server (uploading).
 Tabbed user interface for multitasking, to allow browsing more than one server or even transfer files simultaneously between multiple servers.
 Site Manager to manage server lists and transfer queue for ordering file transfer tasks
 Bookmarks for easy access to most frequent use
 Drag and drop to download and upload.
 Directory comparison for comparing local files and server files in the same directory. When the file doesn't have the same information (name not match, or size not match) it will highlight that file in colour.
 Configurable transfer speed limits to limit the speed transferring the files, which helps reducing error of transferring
 Filename filters, users can filter only specific files that have the conditions they want.
 Network configuration wizard, help configuring confusing network settings in form of step-by-step wizard
 Remote file editing, for quickly edit file on server side on-the-fly. No need to download, edit on the computer and re-upload back to the server.
 Keep-alive, if the connection has been idle for the long time it will check by sending keep-alive command.
 HTTP/1.1, SOCKS5 and FTP-Proxy support
 Logging events to file for debugging, saved at custom location.
 Ability to export queues (pending, failed, finished) into an XML format file
 Synchronised directory browsing
 Remote file search to search file on the server remotely
 Cross-platform. Runs on Windows, Linux, *BSD, Mac OS X
 Supports resume and transfer of large files >4GB
 Secure password storage protected with a master password
 Available in 47 languages worldwide (Arabic, Armenian, Basque, Bulgarian, Catalan, Chinese, Corsican, Croatian, Czech, Danish, Dutch, German, Greek, Estonian, Finnish, French, Galician, Hebrew, Hungarian, Indonesian, Icelandic, Italian, Japanese, Georgian, Khmer, Korean, Kurdish, Kyrgyz, Lithuanian, Latvian, Macedonian, Norwegian, Nepali, Occitan, Persian, Polish, Portuguese, Romanian, Russian, Serbian, Slovak, Slovenian, Spanish, Thai, Turkish, Ukrainian, Vietnamese)

These are some features of FileZilla Server:
 FTP and FTP over TLS (FTPS)
 IPv6 support
 Speed limits
 Large file support >4GB
 Remote administration
 Permissions system with users and groups
 IP filters

Reception
In May 2008, Chris Foresman assessed FTP clients for Ars Technica, saying of FileZilla: "Some friends in the tech support world often recommend the free and open-source FileZilla, which offers a Mac OS X version in addition to Windows and Linux. But I've never been thrilled about its busy interface, which can be daunting for novice users."

Writing for Ars Technica in August 2008 Emil Protalinski said: "this week's free, third-party application recommendation is FileZilla.... This FTP client is very quick and is regularly updated. It may not have a beautiful GUI, but it certainly is fast and has never let me down."

Go Daddy, Clarion University of Pennsylvania and National Capital FreeNet recommend FileZilla for uploading files to their web hosting services.

FileZilla is available in the repositories of many Linux distributions, including Debian, Ubuntu, Trisquel and Parabola GNU/Linux-libre.

In January 2012, CNET gave FileZilla their highest rating of "spectacular"—five out of five stars.

 FileZilla is regularly listed in articles on the top free software applications.

Since the project's participation in SourceForge's program to create revenue by adware, several reviewers started warning about downloading FileZilla and discouraged users from using it.

Criticism

Bundled adware issues

In 2013 the project's hosting site, SourceForge.net, provided the main download of FileZilla with a download wrapper, "offering" additional software for the user to install. Numerous users reported that some of the adware installed without consent, despite declining all install requests, or used deception to obtain the user's "acceptance" to install. Among the reported effects are: web browser being hijacked, with content, start page and search engines being forcibly changed, popup windows, privacy or spying issues, sudden shutdown and restart events possibly leading to loss of current work. Some of the adware was reported to resist removal or restoration of previous settings, or were said to reinstall after a supposed removal. Also, users reported adware programs to download and install more unwanted software, some causing alerts by security suites, for being malware.

The FileZilla webpage offers additional download options without adware installs, but the link to the adware download appears as the primary link, highlighted and marked as "recommended".

As of 2016, FileZilla displays ads (called sponsored updates) when starting the application. These ads appear as part of the "Check for updates" dialog.

In 2018, a further controversy about FileZilla's use of a bundled adware installer caused concern.

Plain text password storage
Until version 3.26 FileZilla stored all saved usernames and passwords as plain text, allowing any malware that had gained even limited access to the user's system to read the data. FileZilla author Tim Kosse was reluctant to add encrypted storage. He stated that it gives a false sense of security, since well-crafted malware can include a keylogger that reads the master password used to secure the data. Users have argued that reading the master password to decrypt the encrypted storage is still harder than just reading the unencrypted storage. A fork called FileZilla Secure was started in November 2016 to add encrypted storage. In May 2017, encrypted storage was also added to the main version, 10 years after it was first requested. Kosse maintained that the feature did not really increase security, as long as the operating system is not secure.

FileZilla Server

FileZilla Server is a sister product to FileZilla Client. It is an FTP server supported by the same project and features support for FTP and FTP over SSL/TLS. FileZilla Server is currently available for Linux, MacOS and Windows platforms.

FileZilla Server is a free, open-source FTP server. Its source code is hosted on the FileZilla Project website.

Features
FileZilla Server supports FTP and FTPS (FTP over SSL/TLS). Other features include:
 Encryption with SSL/TLS (for FTPS)
 Per-user permissions on the underlying file system
 GUI configuration tool
 Speed limits
 IP filtering

FileZilla Client issues
Unlike some other FTP clients, FileZilla Client does not implement a workaround for an error in the IIS server which causes file corruption when resuming large file downloads.

Operating system support
FileZilla Client

See also

 Comparison of FTP client software
 Comparison of FTP server software packages
 WinSCP

Notes

References

External links

 
 Download repository on the official website
 
 FileZilla Server FAQ
 FileZilla Wiki

2001 software
Cross-platform software
Free file transfer software
Free FTP clients
Free multilingual software
Free software programmed in C++
FTP clients
FTP server software
Portable software
SSH File Transfer Protocol clients
Software that uses wxWidgets